In Miller v Janks, an important case in South African insolvency law, the court held that an insolvent possesses an estate capable of being sequestrated even though, at the time of sequestration, his estate consists only of liabilities.

Facts 
Miller had acquired an estate by means of his occupation as a professional gambler. His assets had subsequently disappeared under suspicious circumstances, leaving only liabilities. Miller's wife possessed fixed property, which she had received while Miller was pursuing his occupation.

In an application by Janks to sequestrate Miller's estate, Miller contended that sequestration was not competent because he had no assets and, therefore, no estate.

Law 
In Ex parte Collins, the judge had held that an estate consists both of assets and of liabilities. If there were no assets but only liabilities, there could be no estate (and vice versa). Were this proposition correct, no order of compulsory sequestration could be granted where the debtor, immediately prior to the application for sequestration, had got rid of all his assets by a series of depositions.

Judgment 
The court granted an order sequestrating Miller's estate. It rejected Miller's argument that, because he no longer had any assets, he had ceased to have an estate and that therefore sequestration was not possible.

See also 
 South African insolvency law

References 
 Miller v Janks 1944 TPD 127.

Notes 

1944 in South African law
1944 in case law
South African insolvency case law
Transvaal Provincial Division cases